Phrae can refer to:
the town Phrae
the Phrae Province
Amphoe Mueang Phrae, the district around Phrae town